Ruprechtia is a genus of plant in family Polygonaceae. It contains the following species (but this list may be incomplete):
 Ruprechtia apetala, Weddell
 Ruprechtia howardiana
 Ruprechtia salicifolia, native name viraró.
 Ruprechtia tangarana

References

Polygonaceae genera
Taxonomy articles created by Polbot
Polygonaceae